The  is a subcompact luxury crossover SUV from Lexus, a luxury division of Toyota. It was introduced at the March 2018 Geneva Motor Show as the smallest crossover model in Lexus' lineup, slotted below the compact NX. It is also the first Lexus model based on the same GA-C platform as the E210 series Toyota Corolla. The "UX" name stands for "Urban Explorer".

According to Lexus, the vehicle has a "bold and stylish design that blends expressive bodywork with a compact size". Lexus espouses the UX's "crossover credentials" via "exceptional body rigidity and a low center of gravity for exceptional handling".

The UX comes equipped with Lexus Safety System+ 2.0 as standard equipment.



Concept model

Variants

UX 200 
The UX 200 is powered by a 2.0 L M20A-FKS I4 petrol engine mated with a Direct Shift continuously variable transmission/CVT and front-wheel drive only configuration.

UX 250h/260h 
The UX 250h (sold in China as the UX 260h) is powered by a 2.0 L M20A-FXS I4 petrol hybrid engine mated with an eCVT. It is available in both front-wheel drive or E-Four all-wheel drive system. The hybrid system uses a 1.4 kWh nickel-metal hydride battery.

UX 300e 
In 2019, at the Guangzhou International Automobile Exhibition, Lexus unveiled the UX 300e, their first battery electric vehicle. It uses a 54.3 kWh lithium ion battery.

Production  
In North America, the production of UX started in the fourth quarter of 2018 and sales commenced in December 2018 for the 2019 model year.

In 2020 a update added wireless support for Apple CarPlay and Android Auto along with an 8 or 12.3 screen with higher quality. A digital key was added that is used through the mobile phone, the touchpad was removed, a larger wireless cell phone charging space was added along with ambient lights.

Markets 
The UX is a global model and introduced in 80 countries worldwide.

North America

United States 
The UX is the first Lexus to be offered by a subscription service. It was launched in December 2018. The UX is exclusively offered as a hybrid vehicle for the 2023 model year.

Asia 
The UX made its Asian debut at the August 2018 Gaikindo Indonesia International Auto Show.

Southeast Asia 
The UX was previewed in Malaysia during the 2018 Kuala Lumpur International Motor Show then was launched in Singapore at the 2019 Singapore Motor Show and was launched in Thailand in March 2019.

Europe 
European sales began in October 2018.

Australia 
Australian sales began in the first quarter of 2019.

Specifications

Safety

Sales

References

External links 

 

UX
Cars introduced in 2018
2020s cars
Mini sport utility vehicles
Luxury crossover sport utility vehicles
Front-wheel-drive vehicles
All-wheel-drive vehicles
Hybrid sport utility vehicles
Partial zero-emissions vehicles
ANCAP small off-road
Euro NCAP small off-road
Vehicles with CVT transmission
Production electric cars